Sauvain is a commune in the Loire department in central France. Its church is l'Église Notre Dame de la Nativité.

Geography
The river Lignon du Forez flows through the commune.

Population

See also
 Communes of the Loire department
 Military radio station of Pierre-sur-Haute

References

Communes of Loire (department)